Thomas Guthrie Wills (15 October 1877 – 1912) was a Scottish footballer who played in the Football League for Newcastle United.

References

1877 births
1912 deaths
Scottish footballers
English Football League players
Association football defenders
Ayr F.C. players
Newcastle United F.C. players
Crystal Palace F.C. players
Carlisle United F.C. players